Bucky O'Hare and the Toad Wars! (also known as Bucky O'Hare and the Toad Menace in Canada) is an animated series created by Sunbow Productions, Abrams/Gentile Entertainment, Continuity Comics and the French company IDDH, co-produced by Marvel Productions and distributed by Hasbro's subsidiary Claster Television. It was based on the cult comic Bucky O'Hare, and animated by AKOM.

It debuted in 1991 in the United States, and 1992 in the UK on the BBC.

Differences from the comics
Most of the ideas from the comic book were used for the cartoon, with several major differences: the parallel universe the story takes place in is named the "Aniverse", Willy DuWitt can travel freely between Earth and the Aniverse instead of being stranded there, Bruce is transported into another dimension instead of killed, the Toad Empire are willingly following KOMPLEX instead of brainwashed, Deadeye has a Southern accent instead of a Scottish accent, the nigh-omnipotent mouse is nowhere to be seen, and Jenny reveals her psionic powers to Willy DuWitt. The cartoon explored more of the Aniverse and followed a loose unifying arc, with Bucky's home planet of Warren being captured by the toads in the season premiere and rescued in the finale (which was co-written by Neal Adams).

Characters

Bucky and his crew are members of the S.P.A.C.E. organization, which stands for Sentient Protoplasm Against Colonial Encroachment.
 Bucky O'Hare – a green hare, captains a S.P.A.C.E. frigate named The Righteous Indignation. Voiced by Jason Michas. His crew consists of:
 Jenny – first mate and pilot, a cat from the planet Aldebaran (not to be confused with the star in the real life universe of the same name) with mysterious magical and psionic powers common to the females of her species. They include telepathy, astral projection, energy blasts, and healing. Because of the sacred precepts of Alderbaran, she keeps these powers secret from the other members of the crew, with the exception of Willy, for whom she has overt romantic affections. Voiced by Margot Pinvidic.
 Bruce – Bruiser's older brother, a Betelgeusian Berserker Baboon who served as the Righteous Indignation's engineer. He vanished into another dimension when the ship's photon accelerator malfunctioned during battle. Voiced by Dale Wilson.
 Willy DuWitt – engineer, a pre-teen human from San Francisco who enters the Aniverse via a portal between the ship's photon accelerator and his own accelerator at home. He replaced Bruce, the former engineer, who was killed (or in the franchise's terms, had "attained oneness with the Aniverse"). Later, Willy became stranded in the Aniverse when his parents turned off the photon accelerator back in his room. Bucky and his crew decide to keep Willy a secret from the S.P.A.C.E organization and the Toads. Voiced by Shane Meier.
 Dead-Eye Duck – gunner, a four-armed former space pirate duck from Kanopis III. He is missing an eye, and is impatient and violent, preferring to let his four laser pistols do the talking for him. Unlike the comics where he has a Scottish accent, he has an American accent. Voiced by Scott McNeil.
 AFC Blinky – an advanced AFC ("Android" First Class). It has only one eye and uses the phrase "Calamity and Woe!" to identify problem situations for Bucky and his crew-mates. Voiced by Sam Khouth.

The members of the Toad Empire introduced are as follows:
 KOMPLEX – the undisputed ruler of the Toad Empire. This computer program was designed to run the consumerist toad culture but instead took it over and militarized it. Its name, in toad language, is an anagram for 'Feed me'. Voiced by Long John Baldry.
 Toad Air Marshall – one of KOMPLEX's foremost commanders, with a uniform adorned with medals and a face covered in warts. Voiced by Jay Brazeau.
 Toad Borg – a large, purple cyborg second-in-command under KOMPLEX. Voiced by Richard Newman.
 Storm Toads – the mindless toad soldiers who serve as the primary attack force for the Empire.

Characters only in the animated series
Almost all the characters listed above are both from the comic book and the cartoon. Most of the new ones that were introduced are listed below.
 Bruiser – Bruce's younger brother, a Betelgeusian Berserker Baboon who joins Bucky's team as space marine on the Righteous Indignation. He, like all berserker baboons, scares the toads out of their wits and loves to beat them up. He is dimwitted but well-meaning, and has great respect for Willy. Voiced by Dale Wilson.
 Commander Dogstar – Bucky's ally, captain of The Indefatigable, another frigate fighting against the toads. Voiced by Garry Chalk.
 Mimi LaFloo – A fox (so to speak) originally a captive of the toads, Mimi is rescued by Bucky and goes on to command her own mammal frigate, The Screaming Mimi. Voiced by Margot Pinvidic.
 Frix and Frax – the Air Marshal's two bumbling subordinates. Voiced by Terry Klassen and Scott McNeil respectively.
 Al Negator – a sleazasaur (bipedal crocodile) spy and mercenary frequently hired by the Air Marshal. He dresses and speaks in a manner consistent to the cajun people. Voiced by Garry Chalk.

Episode list

Home media releases
Family Home Entertainment released all thirteen episodes of the show on six VHS cassettes in North America. In the United Kingdom, BBC Video released twelve out of the thirteen episodes across six VHS tapes, then Metrodome Entertainment released all thirteen episodes on a Region 2 DVD set, as well as a single volume DVD, both of which are now out of print.

References

External links
 The Bucky O'Hare Fan Fiction & Information Site
 
 Bucky O'Hare and the Toad Wars at the TV.com
 

1990s American animated television series
1990s French animated television series
1991 American television series debuts
1991 American television series endings
American children's animated action television series
American children's animated space adventure television series
American children's animated science fantasy television series
1990s American science fiction television series
BBC children's television shows
Bucky O'Hare
English-language television shows
French children's animated action television series
French children's animated space adventure television series
French children's animated science fantasy television series
Television shows based on comics
Television series set on fictional planets
Television shows set in San Francisco
Television series by Sunbow Entertainment
Television series by Marvel Productions
Animated television series about rabbits and hares
Animated television series about frogs
Animated television series about extraterrestrial life
Television series by Claster Television